Saira Naseem is a Pakistani singer who formerly was a playback singer in the Lollywood films during the era of 1990s. She has received 3 Best Playback Singer Nigar Awards.

Career
Naseem started her singing career in the film Hum Se Hai Zamana, which was released in 1987. She sang a chorus song for the film along with A. Nayyar, Munir Hussain, and Masood Rana. There on, her career as a playback vocalist kept moving forward and she sang 55 songs in 81 Urdu and Punjabi movies. Apart from film songs, she also sings poems, ghazals, and naats.

Selected songography
 1994 (Film: International Luteray - Urdu) ... Main Jungle Ki Bulbul, Mujhay Pinjray Mein Rakhwa, Music: Wajahat Attre, Poet: Khawaja Pervez
 1994 (Film: International Luteray - Urdu) ... Meri Kamar Peerh Shuru Ho Geyi, Kuchh Kar Jania, Music: Wajahat Attray, Poet: Khawaja Parvez
 1994 (Film: Laat Sahib - Punjabi) ... Teinu Meray Leyi Rabb Nay Banaya, Music: M. Ashraf, Poet: Khawaja Parvez
 1996 (Film: Chor Machaye Shor - Urdu) ... Ghari Raat Ka Eik Bajaye Aur Janu Ghar Na Aye, Music: M. Arshad, Poet: ?
 1997 (Film: Sangam - Urdu) ... Aa Pyar Dil Mein Jaga, Music: Amjad Bobby, Poet: ?
 1998 (Film: Choorian - Punjabi) ... Neray Neray Aa Zalma Way, Main Thak Geyi Aan, Music: Zulfiqar Ali, Poet: ?
 1998 (Film: Choorian - Punjabi) ... Tor Sattan Choorian Tay Khol Suttan Waal, Music: Zulfiqar Ali, Poet: ?
 1998 (Film: Choorian - Punjabi) ... Udd Kothay Uttun Kanwan Way, Music: Zulfiqar Ali, Poet: Rukhsana Noor
 1998 (Film: Nikah - Urdu) ... Main Yun Milun Tujh Say, Music: M. Arshad, Poet: ?

Awards

References

Pakistani folk singers
Punjabi-language singers
Living people
Punjabi singers
Nigar Award winners
Pakistani playback singers
Year of birth missing (living people)
 20th-century Pakistani women singers